Barbados competes at the 2009 World Championships in Athletics from 15–23 August in Berlin.

Team selection

Results

Men

Women

References

External links
Official competition website

Nations at the 2009 World Championships in Athletics
World Championships in Athletics
Barbados at the World Championships in Athletics